Seyyed Morad (also Romanized as Seyyed Morād; also known as Sādāt-e Ḩayāt Gheyb and Sādāt-e Ḩayāt Gheybī) is a village in Jahangiri Rural District, in the Central District of Masjed Soleyman County, Khuzestan Province, Iran. At the 2006 census, its population was 53, in 10 families.

References 

Populated places in Masjed Soleyman County